English Rugby Union Midland Division - Midlands 6 East (S) is an English Rugby Union League.

Midlands 6 East (S) is made up of teams from around the East Midlands of England who play home and away matches throughout a winter season. As with many low level they are often subject to re-structure.

Promoted teams move up to Midlands 5 East (South).

Teams 2008-2009

Anstey RUFC
Stamford RUFC
Stamford College O.B. RUFC 
St. Ives RUFC 
St Neots RUFC
Thorney
Westwood RUFC

Teams 2007-2008

Anstey RUFC
Aylestonians RUFC
Kempston RUFC
March Bears RUFC 
Stamford College O.B. RUFC 
St Neots RUFC
Thorney
Wellingborough O.G. RUFC

See also

 English rugby union system

7